The 1997 Women's Pro Fastpitch season was the first season of women's professional softball for Women's Pro Fastpitch (WPF).  The season began on May 30, 1997 and finished in a championship series between the two highest finishers.

Teams, cities and stadiums

Milestones and Events
Launching the WPF

The WPF was the second attempt at an American professional women's fastpitch softball league.  The previous league, the International Women's Professional Softball Association, lasted from 1976-1979.

In January 1989, former Utah State pitcher Jane Cowles, approached her parents, Sage and John, owners of Cowles Media Company, with a plan for a professional women's fastpitch league.  They believed there was potential in the idea, and began a period of research.  They raised funds to establish the National Fastpitch Association (NFA) in 1991 in Boulder, Colorado.

In June 1993, the NFA held an exhibition series of two teams of former collegiate fastpitch players around the country.  After evaluating the success of the exhibitions, the NFA focused research on possible markets, investors and sponsors.  NFA's moved their offices to Minneapolis/St. Paul where Jay Cowles, Jane's brother, become CEO.

On January 19, 1994, Jay Cowles officially announced the formation of the National Fastpitch Association. Plans to begin league play in 1996 with an exhibition tour scheduled for the summer of 1995 was announced.

Making the game's national debut on August 11, 1994, the Decatur Pride and the California Commotion faced off at Borg Warner Stadium in Decatur, Illinois, later broadcast by ESPN2. By late fall of 1994, planning for an exhibition Tour was underway, and  NFA changed its name to Women's Professional Fastpitch (WPF). In February 1995,  Mitzi Swentzell, former Executive Vice President of the Denver Nuggets, assumed the position of President and CEO.

From June 15 to July 13, the 1995 WPF Tour featured two All-Star teams, called the Blaze and the Storm, that played  in 16 cities and eight states.

WPF held its first draft at its Minneapolis offices on October 31, 1995. Swentzell announced that the league would play its first season in the summer of 1997.  WPF offices moved to Denver, and another draft, consisting of 1997 college seniors, was held March 20.

After more than eight years of planning, the WPF played its first games May 30, 1997. Opening games were played in Durham and Orlando. The Virginia Roadsters claimed the first win in league history, defeating the Durham Dragons 2-1 in a broadcast on ESPN2.  Games that season were also shown on the Sunshine Network, Fox Sports South and WPEN-LP.

Teams played a 72-game schedule, with the winners of each half meeting in a championship series.  Each team had a salary cap of $74,000 for their 15-player rosters. AT&T Wireless was the main sponsor, promising $4 million over three seasons.  The league owned everything from vending rights to player contracts to franchises.

Player Acquisition

College Draft

NewsOK.com reported that, in anticipation of the launch of the WPF,  a draft was held in October, 1995.  Among those drafted included Michelle Smith and Lisa Fernandez.  NewsOK.com also reported that the draftees would be assigned to teams in the Midwest and the West Coast and that the WPF would begin play in 1996.  As no teams were on the West Coast and the league launched in 1997, these detail were premature.

A 1997 draft of college seniors was held March 20.

League standings 
Source:

WPF Championship
The 1997 WPF Championship Series was a best-of-five series between the Orlando Wahoos and the Virginia Roadsters.  The Wahoos won both halves of the season, with the Roadsters finishing behind them.

Annual awards
Sources:

References

External links

See also

 List of professional sports leagues
 List of professional sports teams in the United States and Canada

Softball teams
Softball in the United States
Pro Fastpitch season
Soft